Naoufel Zerhouni is a Moroccan professional footballer who plays as a winger for Raja CA, on loan from for Saudi club Al-Hazem, and the Morocco national team.

On 6 January 2022, Zerhouni joined Al-Hazem.

Honours 
RC Oued Zem

 Botola 2: 2016-17

Morocco
 African Nations Championship: 2018

References

1995 births
Living people
Moroccan footballers
Association football wingers
Raja CA players
Rapide Oued Zem players
Fath Union Sport players
Al-Hazem F.C. players
Botola players
Saudi Professional League players
Saudi First Division League players
Expatriate footballers in Saudi Arabia
Moroccan expatriate sportspeople in Saudi Arabia
2020 African Nations Championship players
Morocco A' international footballers